Next Sohee ( is a 2022 South Korean drama film, directed by Jung Ju-ri and starring Bae Doona and Kim Si-eun. The film revolves around a high school student, Sohee (Kim Si-eun), who has to go on field training to her call center, and a female detective, Yu-jin, who doubts this. It is loosely inspired by the real-life suicide of a girl on a similar 'externship' program.It was selected as the first Korean closing film at the 2022 Cannes Film Festival and screened as part of the 'International Critics' Week' section for special screenings. 

The film was screened on May 25, 2022 at Espace Miramar in Cannes and received a 7 minute standing ovation. It was also screened at the 26th Fantasia International Film Festival as the closing film and won the Best Director award in the Cheval Noir competition category and the Best Asian Feature silver award in the Audience Award category. It was released on February 8, 2023 in South Korea.

Synopsis
The film is about Sohee (Kim Si-eun), a high school student who starts training for a subcontracted position at a call center. She is unable to bear the stressful work culture. A mysterious incident leads to her death. Detective Oh Yoo-jin (Bae Doona) starts an investigation into her death.

Cast
 Bae Doona as Yoo-jin
 Kim Si-eun as So-hee 
 Sim Hee-seop as Lee Jun-ho
 Park Woo-young as Dong-ho
 Yoo Jung-ho as Manager of the SAVE department of the call center
 Choi Hee-jin as Lee Bo-ram
 Jung Hoe-rin as Jun-hee  
 Kim Woo-kyum
 Song Yo-sep

Production
At the end of 2016, director July Jung saw a story of a high school girl sent by her school to work as an intern in a telecommunication company’s call center to gain real-world work experience. But, within three months she committed suicide on her job. The investigation brought to the surface that the girl experienced stressful working conditions in the call center. This story became the basis of her film titled Next Sohee. 

Next Sohee is Jung's second film, following the 2014 detective drama A Girl at My Door, which also starred Bae Doona and was invited to the "Un Certain Regard" selection of the 67th Cannes Film Festival.

Principal photography began on January 16, 2022 and filming wrapped on February 28, 2022.

Release
The film had its world premiere at the Parallel sections of the Cannes Film Festival in the International Critics' Week on 25 May 2022 at the Espace Miramar theater. Subsequently it will be released in South Korea in 2022. It was also invited to the competition section of the Amsterdam Film Festival, and selected as the closing film of the 26th Fantasia International Film Festival in the Cheval Noir section, where it was screened on August 3, 2022. At the festival it won the Best Director award in the Cheval Noir competition category and the Best Asian Feature silver award in the Audience Award category. It also made it to the 'Korean Cinema Today - Panorama' section of the 27th Busan International Film Festival and was screened on October 6, 2022.

The film was released theatrically in South Korea on February 8, 2023.

Home media
The film was made available for streaming on IPTV (KT olleh TV, SK Btv, LG U+ TV), Home Choice, Google Play, satellite TV (Skylife), WAVVE,  Naver Series ON, Google Play, Cinefox, Watcha Play, and Webhard from March 16, 2023.

Reception

Box office
The film was released theatrically on 562 screens on February 8, 2023.

, with gross of US$744,460 and 101,804 admissions, it is at the 13th place among Korean films released in 2023.

Critical response

On the review aggregator Rotten Tomatoes website, the film has an approval rating of 92% based on 13 reviews, with an average rating of 8/10.

The film has received positive reviews from international critics. It received a standing ovation of 7 minutes at the premiere at the Cannes Film Festival. Patrick Brzeski of The Hollywood Reporter introduced Next Sohee as "Cannes' hidden gem". Whereas Wendy Ide of Screen Daily found the film "leisurely paced" and appreciated the direction of Jung Ju-ri writing, "Jung’s direction is unshowy but solid, with minimal score and a focus on persuasive performances captured by an empathetic lens." However, Ide criticized her writing, stating, "this has the feel of a screenplay which could have benefited by a sharper focus and a leaner approach to its storytelling." Clarence Tsui of the South China Morning Post gave the film 4 stars out of 5 and praised the performance of Kim Si-eun writing, "Kim puts in a powerful performance as a student crushed by her work at a call centre." He opined that the film could be "delineated into two halves that could be described as the 'personal' and the 'political'". In the second half Bae Doona takes over the story as detective Yoo-jin, where she investigates Sohee’s demise and seeks justice. Concluding his review, Tsui wrote, "Jung has stirred up a stink with a film that’s visceral to the extreme in revealing the dark dealings that make an economy click, and a steep warning about the possibilities of more Sohees to suffer from such indignity and injustice." 

Elena Lazic writing for The Playlist criticized the director's approach on handling the film, writing, "the director opts for a less believable and more dramatic blunt-force approach, rather than portray her [Sohee's] experience there as one that slowly comes to affect her mind and priorities until her warped sense of priorities and self-worth leads her to end her life." Lazic, giving the film a C, concluded by stating, "The film’s attempt at evoking both Sohee and Oh Yoo-jin’s shared humanity feels rather trite, and its overall emotional landscape and its study of exploitation, both are stuck in a rather monotonous sense of indignation and tragedy that ultimately feels frustratingly unproductive". French critics site Le Bleu du Miroir praised the performances of actors and screenplay writing, "Magnificently carried by its two actresses, neat in its writing and in its staging without fuss but always at the service of the story and its characters, Next Sohee asserts itself as an excellent closing choice for Critics' Week and confirms the promises of a filmmaker to follow." Panos Kotzathanasis reviewing the film for HanCinema rated it with 7.5/10 and praised the editing writing, "editing results in a slow pace that suits the aesthetics of the movie to perfection". He also appreciated cinematography opining, "cinematography captures the bleakness of the lives of the protagonists through mostly saturated colors and mid-shots". Concluding Kotzathanasis wrote, "Next Sohee is an excellent drama that highlights the issues with the Korean system and their consequences in the most pointed but also rewarding way."

Accolades

References

External links

 
 
 
 
 
 

2022 films
2022 drama films
2020s Korean-language films
South Korean drama films
South Korean films based on actual events